Close-Up Vol. 2, People & Places is the ninth studio album released by New York-based singer/songwriter and musician Suzanne Vega. The album consists of re-recordings of songs from Vega's back catalogue with stripped-down arrangements that highlight her lyrics and melodies. The track "The Man Who Played God" was included in its original version on the album Dark Night of the Soul, by Danger Mouse and Sparklehorse.

Track listing

Personnel
 Suzanne Vega: vocals, acoustic guitar, producer, liner notes
 Gerry Leonard: electric & acoustic guitar, cello arrangement (7), additional arrangement
 Mike Visceglia: bass, cello arrangement (7), additional arrangement
 Karl Berger: string arrangement
 Ruby Froom: backing vocals
 Bob Ludwig: mastering
 Doug Yowell: percussion
 Brooklyn Rider: string quartet

Charts

References

2010 albums
Suzanne Vega albums